The Four Nations Tournament is an invitational women's football tournament taking place in various cities of China since 1998. Since 2002, it has been held every year except for 2010. United States, Norway, China, North Korea, and Canada are the only winners of various editions of this tournament. The United States and China have been the most successful, winning seven editions of the tournament.

Results

Performance by team

General statistics
As of 2019

Top scorer

See also
 FIFA Women's World Cup
 Football at the Summer Olympics (Women's tournament)
 Algarve Cup
 Arnold Clark Cup
 China Cup
 Cup of Nations
 Cyprus Women's Cup
 Four Nations Tournament
 Istria Cup
 Pinatar Cup
 SheBelieves Cup
 Tournament of Nations
 Tournoi de France
 Turkish Women's Cup
 Women's Revelations Cup
 Yongchuan International Tournament

External links
 RSSSF website

 
International women's association football competitions hosted by China
International women's association football invitational tournaments
Recurring sporting events established in 1998
1998 establishments in China